The Nepal Nursing Council (NNC) is a statutory body for establishing uniform and high standards of Nursing education in Nepal. The Council grants recognition of nursing qualifications, gives accreditation to Nursing schools, administers Nursing Licensing Exam (NLEN) and  maintains the registration of Registered Nurses in Nepal. 

NNC was established in 1996 under Nepal Nursing Council Act 1996. Chairperson of NNC is nominated by the Nepal government from among qualified individuals. 

NNC is one of many statutory bodies related to Healthcare in Nepal. Other are Nepal Medical Council, Nepal Pharmacy Council, Nepal Ayurvedic Medical Council, Nepal Health Professional Council, Nepal Health Research Council.

See also
Nepal Engineering Council
Nepal Medical Council

References

Education in Nepal
Regulatory agencies of Nepal
1996 establishments in Nepal